AtmosFEAR is a  drop tower on the Surfside Pier at Morey's Piers amusement park in New Jersey. It was designed by A.R.M. and Larson International, and officially opened in May 2005.

AtmosFEAR creates freefall speeds of 50 mph with a vertical acceleration upwards of three G's. The ride experience on AtmosFEAR features a very slow ascent, which is accented by custom designed LED lighting and an on-board sound system with thunderous sound effects. As the vehicle climbs, fog fills the air, and then without warning the vehicle is released and literally forced downward by a special launch system that generates faster-than-freefall speeds. It is the third-tallest ride at Morey's Piers.

References
 Timeline of Morey's Piers
 Morey's Piers

Amusement rides introduced in 2005
Amusement rides manufactured by Larson International
Drop tower rides
Morey's Piers
Towers completed in 2005